Ourimbah railway station is a heritage-listed railway station located on the Main Northern line in New South Wales, Australia. It serves the northern Central Coast suburb of Ourimbah opening on 15 August 1887. The station had passing loops and a freight yard that were removed in March 1993.

The station was upgraded with lifts added in August 2021.

Platforms & services
Ourimbah has two side platforms. It is serviced by NSW TrainLink Central Coast & Newcastle Line services travelling from Sydney Central to Newcastle. Peak-hour services travel from Central to Wyong via the North Shore line.

Transport links
Busways operate two routes via Ourimbah station:
36: Gosford station to Westfield Tuggerah via Narara
37: Gosford station to Westfield Tuggerah via Wyoming

Red Bus Services operate one route via Ourimbah station:
47: Stockland Bay Village to Wyong station

References

External links

Ourimbah station details Transport for New South Wales

Central Coast (New South Wales)
Railway stations in Australia opened in 1887
Regional railway stations in New South Wales
Short-platform railway stations in New South Wales, 4 cars
Main North railway line, New South Wales